For people with the surname, see Lyden (surname).

Lyden is a town in Mogalakwena Local Municipality in the Limpopo province of South Africa.

References

Populated places in the Mogalakwena Local Municipality